One More Day is the sixth studio album by American country music band Diamond Rio. It was released in 2001. Although its lead-off single "Stuff" peaked at #36 on the Hot Country Songs charts, the title track, "One More Day", became popular on radio after the death of Dale Earnhardt, Sr., and went on to become a Number One country hit. Also released from this album were "Sweet Summer" and "That's Just That". "I'm Trying" was previously recorded by Kevin Sharp on his 1998 album Love Is, and later by Martina McBride on her 2009 album Shine.

Recording
One More Day was recorded in 18 months. The band discussed their view of the album on Arista's website in 2000. "We feel like we've got the best group of songs that we've ever had on record," said Dana Williams. "Every time we do a record, we feel that way - if you don't, then there's something wrong." The group made a conscious effort to conquer new musical territory with this project. "Part of what we set out to do on this record was to do something that we hadn't done before, and try to approach things in a different manner," said Gene Johnson. "Dana and I approached the harmony vocals differently. In fact, we did a lot of harmony vocals on this album; there's not a whole lot of Marty by himself." Johnson continued, "We have unique instrumentation, and we're all distinctive players. So one of the things we didn't want to do was get too much light material. We wanted it to be pretty serious." The album's intended title was to be "Stuff" after the title of the first single.. The commercial failure of that single caused the title and original track listing of the album to be changed.

Track listing

Personnel 

Diamond Rio
 Marty Roe – lead vocals 
 Dan Truman – keyboards
 Jimmy Olander – acoustic guitar, electric guitars
 Gene Johnson – mandolin, harmony vocals
 Dana Williams – bass, harmony vocals 
 Brian Prout – drums

Guest musicians
 Chely Wright – lead and harmony vocals on "I'm Trying"

Production 
 Diamond Rio – producers
 Mike Clute – producer, engineer, mixing 
 Beth Lee – art direction 
 Sally Carns – design 
 Jim "Señor" McGuire – photography
 Mary Beth Felts – grooming 
 Claudia Fowler – stylist 
 Dreamcatcher Artist Management – management

Charts

Weekly charts

Year-end charts

Certifications

References

2001 albums
Diamond Rio albums
Arista Records albums